Rudkol (also Romanized as Rūdkol and Rood Kal; also known as Rud-Gul and Rūd Kad) is a village in Kenar Sar Rural District, Kuchesfahan District, Rasht County, Gilan Province, Iran. At the 2006 census, its population was 139, in 41 families.

References 

Populated places in Rasht County